Blaise is a masculine given name and surname. It is the French derivation of the Latin Blaesus (later Blasius), Greek Βλασιος (Vlasios), and is of uncertain etymological origin, though perhaps meaning "to stammer", "stutter".

One of the first known to bear the name was Quintus Junius Blaesus, who was ennobled and became a proconsul. Saint Blaise of Sebastia was venerated as a Christian Saint and martyr.

People

Given name
Baboucarr-Blaise Jagne, Gambian foreign minister and United Nations representative
Blaise Alexander, American race car driver
Blaise Cendrars, Franco-Swiss novelist and poet
Blaise Compaoré, President of Burkina Faso
Blaise Diagne, Senegalese politician, mayor of Dakar
Blaise Diesbourg, American gangster and bootlegger
Blaise Garza, American actor
Blaise Gisbert, French Jesuit rhetorician and critic
Blaise Koissy, Côte d'Ivoire football player
Blaise Kouassi (footballer, born 1974), former Côte d'Ivoire football defender
Blaise Kouassi (footballer, born 1983), Ivorian footballer
Blaise Kufo, Congolese-Swiss football player
Blaise Matuidi, French football player
Blaise de Montluc, French soldier
Blaise Pascal, French mathematician
Blaise Rabetafika, Malagasy diplomat
Blaise Sonnery, French cyclist
Blaise Daniel Staples, American classicist
Blaise de Vigenère, French diplomat and cryptographer
Blaise Winter, American football player and speaker
Mamadou Blaise Sangaré, Malian politician
Jean-Blaise Martin, French opera singer

Surname
Clark Blaise, Canadian author
Kerlin Blaise, American football player
Marie-Joseph Blaise de Chénier, French poet, dramatist, and politician
Pierre Blaise, French actor
Saint Blaise, Armenian physician and bishop of Sebaste (Sivas)
Serge Moléon Blaise, Haitian painter
Tara Blaise, Irish singer
Jean-Blaise Kololo, Congolese politician and diplomat
Matthew Blaise, Nigerian queer rights activist

Fictional characters
Blaise, in some accounts was Merlin's master in Arthurian legends. In Malory's version he appeared to Merlin to warn him of Nimue's mischief.
Blaise Jeannot Andrieux, from the Wild Cards series of books
Blaise Zabini, a minor Slytherin character in J.K. Rowling's Harry Potter series
Modesty Blaise, heroine of a Peter O'Donnell comic strip

Spellings 
The following are related to the forename Blaise:

 Armenian: Բարսեղ (Barsegh)
 Catalan: Blai
 Croatian: Blaž; Vlaho (Dubrovnik region)
 English: Blaise, Blase, Blaize, Blaze
 French: Blaise
 Galician: Βrais
 German: Blasius
 Greek: Βλασιος (Vlasios)
 Hungarian: Balázs
 Italian: Biagio
 Kurdish: بله‌یز
 Latin: Blasius
 Polish: Błażej
 Portuguese: Brás (archaic spelling Braz)
 Romanian: Vlasie, Vasile
 Russian: Власий (Vlasiy)
 Spanish: Blas
 Turkish: Vlas
 Ukrainian: Улас (Ulas)

See also
 Saint Blaise (disambiguation)
 Blaise (disambiguation)
 Blaize (given name)
 Blaize (surname)
 Blais

French masculine given names
French-language surnames
Surnames from given names